History of Biology is a simple browser-based scavenger huntstyle educational game that was created by Spongelab Interactive. It is designed to teach high school students and general interest groups about the history of biology.

Details
The game's purpose is to teach about the discoveries and research of over 20 scientists as missions are completed. For instance, in the first mission, "The Art of Imitation", players learn about Zacharias Janssen, credited with inventing the compound microscope. The scientists highlighted in this game are; Antonie van Leeuwenhoek, Robert Hooke, Matthias Schleiden, Theodor Schwann, Rudolf Virchow, Carl Linnaeus, Jean-Baptiste Lamarck, Gregor Mendel, Charles Darwin, Alfred Russel Wallace, Johannes Friedrich Miescher, Oswald Avery, Colin MacLeod, Maclyn McCarty, Alfred Hershey, Martha Chase, James D. Watson, Francis Crick, Rosalind Franklin, Frederick Sanger, and Kary Mullis.

Various scientific discoveries from the 15th century to all the way to the 21st century are dealt  within this game. For example, cell theory is explored by analyzing letters and stamps. Finding the answer to this clue means researching terms such as metabolism, nerve cells, and pepsin. To introduce the mechanisms of diversity and the work of Charles Darwin, players explore maps, find GPS coordinates and read about Darwin's research on the evolution of finches.

The clues in each mission are randomised so that every player has a different path to determine the solution. The overall mission is the same for everyone. This allows players to use various methods to complete the same mission and move on to the next level.

The game is meant to provide an interactive way to learn about historical events in biology.

As players complete each mission, they are sent a victory email from one of the game characters. This email usually contains a teaser about what the next mission will entail.

The notepad feature in History of Biology, which is visible to teachers, allows them to answer questions or deal with specific content students may be interested in or struggling with, in class. As for the teacher, there is a detailed teacher's guide with a walk-through of each mission. A back-end administration area allows teachers to control which missions are available to students.

In the news

References

External links
Official History of Biology Website

Science educational video games
Video games developed in Canada